Padruskalnys is a village in Kėdainiai district municipality, in Kaunas County, in central Lithuania. According to the 2011 census, the village had a population of 10 people. It is located by the Druskalnis and Girdelis rivulets, by the limit of Radviliškis district municipality.

Demography

References

Villages in Kaunas County
Kėdainiai District Municipality